Zdolbúniv is a small city in the Rivne Raion of Rivne Oblast (province) of western Ukraine. Prior to the administrative reform of 2020, it was the administrative center of the former Zdolbuniv Raion (district), and it has an important railway station and cement plant (there is a deposit of chalk). Population:

History
The town was mentioned in 1497 in the deed, in which the Lithuanian Grand Duke and future King of Poland Alexander Jagiellon committed several villages to Prince Konstanty Ostrogski. Among the villages mentioned in the deed was Dolbunov. The town has had its present name of Zdolbuniv since 1629. In 1569, following the Union of Lublin, Zdolbuniv became part of the Kingdom of Poland, where it remained for over 200 years, until the Partitions of Poland. In 1793, it was annexed by the Russian Empire, and in the interbellum period, it again belonged to Poland. It was a powiat (country) centre in Wołyń Voivodeship during this period. Zdolbunow, as it was then known, was an important rail hub, located near the Polish-Soviet border. The town had a mixed Polish-Ukrainian-Jewish population.

In September 1939, following the Soviet Invasion of Poland, Zdolbunow was captured by the Soviet Union, where it remained until the Operation Barbarossa. Its Jewish minority was murdered in the Holocaust, and in late 1943, Zdolbunow became a shelter for ethnic Polish population of Volhynia, escaping the Volhynian Genocide. On February 3, 1944, the town was captured by the Red Army.

Zdolbuniv is the birthplace of a contemporary Polish painter Stanislaw Fijalkowski (born 1922), and singer Teresa Tutinas (born 1943)

Gallery

References

Cities in Rivne Oblast
Volhynian Governorate
Wołyń Voivodeship (1921–1939)
Cities of district significance in Ukraine
Holocaust locations in Ukraine